Lunascape is a web browser developed by Lunascape Corporation in Tokyo, Japan. It is unusual in that it contains three rendering engines: Gecko (used in Mozilla Firefox), WebKit (used in Apple's Safari), and Trident (used in Microsoft Internet Explorer). This feature is common only to the Avant web browser. The user can switch between layout engines seamlessly.

Lunascape is available for Windows and Android platforms, as well as for iPad and iPhone.

History
Lunascape was released in October 2001 while the founders were in college. As the browser became popular, Hidekazu Kondo established the Lunascape Corporation in August 2004 while pursuing a PhD. Hidekazu Kondo then became the CEO of Lunascape Corporation. Additionally, Lunascape was selected as an "Exploratory Software Project" commissioned by the Japanese government.

The company branched out to the United States and as of June 2008 is based in Sunnyvale, California. 

Lunascape introduced its browser internationally in December 2008.

In late 2019, Lunascape was acquired by G.U.Labs, with Hidekazu Kondo remaining as a representative director.

References

External links
 

Cross-platform web browsers
MacOS web browsers
iOS web browsers
Windows web browsers
Android web browsers
2001 software